Pontibacter niistensis  is a Gram-negative and rod-shaped bacterium from the genus of Pontibacter which has been isolated from forest soil from the Western Ghats in India.

References

External links
Type strain of Pontibacter niistensis at BacDive -  the Bacterial Diversity Metadatabase

Cytophagia
Bacteria described in 2010